Tun Mohamed Eusoff bin Chin (born 5 May 1936) is a retired Malaysian lawyer who served as the second Chief Justice of Malaysia.

Honours
  :
  Companion of the Order of Loyalty to the Crown of Malaysia (JSM) (1978)
  Commander of the Order of Loyalty to the Crown of Malaysia (PSM) – Tan Sri (1993)
  Grand Commander of the Order of Loyalty to the Crown of Malaysia (SSM) – Tun (1997)
  :
  Grand Knight of the Order of Cura Si Manja Kini (SPCM) – Dato' Seri (1995)
  :
  Member Grand Companion of the Order of Sultan Mahmud I of Terengganu (SSMT) – Dato' Seri (1997)
  :
  Grand Commander of the Exalted Order of Malacca (DGSM) – Datuk Seri (1999)

References

1936 births
Living people
Chief justices of Malaysia
20th-century Malaysian judges
Grand Commanders of the Order of Loyalty to the Crown of Malaysia
Commanders of the Order of Loyalty to the Crown of Malaysia
Companions of the Order of Loyalty to the Crown of Malaysia